The 1991–92 NBA season was the Rockets' 25th season in the National Basketball Association, and 21st season in the city of Houston. The Rockets started the season defeating the Los Angeles Lakers at The Summit in double-overtime 126–121, and got off to a fast start winning nine of their first twelves games. However, they would start to struggle losing five consecutive games afterwards, but managed to hold a 25–22 record at the All-Star break. By February 21, they hovered at .500 with a mediocre 26–26 record when head coach Don Chaney was fired and replaced with assistant Rudy Tomjanovich.

Under Tomjanovich, the Rockets would win eleven of their first 15 games. However, they struggled losing ten of their last 15 games, as Hakeem Olajuwon missed 12 games due to a hamstring injury, which the Rockets' management accused him of faking because of a contract dispute, and suspended him. The Rockets lost their final three games to close the season, finishing third in the Midwest Division with a 42–40 record, missing the playoffs by just one game behind the 8th-seeded Lakers, who were without All-Star guard Magic Johnson, who had retired due to HIV.

Olajuwon averaged 21.6 points, 12.1 rebounds, 1.8 steals and 4.3 blocks per game, while Otis Thorpe averaged 17.3 points and 10.5 rebounds per game. Olajuwon and Thorpe were both selected for the 1992 NBA All-Star Game. In addition, Vernon Maxwell provided the team with 17.2 points and 4.1 assists per game, while Kenny Smith contributed 14.0 points and 6.9 assists per game, sixth man Sleepy Floyd provided with 9.1 points per game off the bench, and Buck Johnson contributed 8.6 points per game. Following the season, Johnson signed as a free agent with the Washington Bullets.

Draft picks

Roster

Regular season

Season standings

y – clinched division title
x – clinched playoff spot

z – clinched division title
y – clinched division title
x – clinched playoff spot

Record vs. opponents

Game log

Regular season

|- align="center" bgcolor="#ccffcc"
| 3
| November 5
| Portland
| W 106–99
|
|
|
| The Summit
| 2–1
|- align="center" bgcolor="#ccffcc"
| 4
| November 7
| Cleveland
| W 105–86
|
|
|
| The Summit
| 3–1
|- align="center" bgcolor="#ccffcc"
| 5
| November 9
| Phoenix
| W 96–95
|
|
|
| The Summit
| 4–1
|- align="center" bgcolor="#ccffcc"
| 9
| November 19
| New York
| W 90–79
|
|
|
| The Summit
| 7–2

|- align="center" bgcolor="#ffcccc"
| 17
| December 7
| Utah
| L 91–96
|
|
|
| The Summit
| 9–8
|- align="center" bgcolor="#ccffcc"
| 18
| December 10
| @ Portland
| W 108–106
|
|
|
| Memorial Coliseum
| 10–8
|- align="center" bgcolor="#ffcccc"
| 29
| December 30
| @ Cleveland
| L 89–121
|
|
|
| Richfield Coliseum
| 16–13

|- align="center" bgcolor="#ccffcc"
| 35
| January 11
| Seattle
| W 119–115
|
|
|
| The Summit
| 19–16
|- align="center" bgcolor="#ffcccc"
| 38
| January 18
| @ Utah
| L 80–108
|
|
|
| Delta Center
| 20–18
|- align="center" bgcolor="#ffcccc"
| 41
| January 25
| @ Chicago
| L 100–114
|
|
|
| Chicago Stadium
| 22–19
|- align="center" bgcolor="#ccffcc"
| 43
| January 30
| Chicago
| W 105–102
|
|
|
| The Summit
| 24–19

|- align="center" bgcolor="#ffcccc"
| 44
| February 1
| @ Phoenix
| L 92–106
|
|
|
| Arizona Veterans Memorial Coliseum
| 24–20
|- align="center" bgcolor="#ffcccc"
| 46
| February 5
| @ Boston
| L 85–98
|
|
|
| Boston Garden
| 25–21
|- align="center" bgcolor="#ffcccc"
| 47
| February 6
| @ New York
| L 85–102
|
|
|
| Madison Square Garden
| 25–22
|- align="center" bgcolor="#ffcccc"
| 48
| February 11
| @ Seattle
| L 99–105
|
|
|
| Seattle Center Coliseum
| 25–23
|- align="center" bgcolor="#ccffcc"
| 50
| February 14
| Boston
| W 105–99
|
|
|
| The Summit
| 26–24
|- align="center" bgcolor="#ffcccc"
| 54
| February 21
| @ Utah
| L 97–124
|
|
|
| Delta Center
| 27–27

|- align="center" bgcolor="#ffcccc"
| 59
| March 3
| @ Phoenix
| L 107–112 (2OT)
|
|
|
| Arizona Veterans Memorial Coliseum
| 31–28
|- align="center" bgcolor="#ccffcc"
| 66
| March 15
| Utah
| W 106–97
|
|
|
| The Summit
| 36–30
|- align="center" bgcolor="#ffcccc"
| 68
| March 19
| Seattle
| L 91–112
|
|
|
| The Summit
| 37–31
|- align="center" bgcolor="#ffcccc"
| 70
| March 24
| @ Seattle
| L 106–128
|
|
|
| Seattle Center Coliseum
| 37–33
|- align="center" bgcolor="#ffcccc"
| 72
| March 28
| @ Portland
| L 95–115
|
|
|
| Memorial Coliseum
| 37–35

|- align="center" bgcolor="#ccffcc"
| 79
| April 14
| Portland
| W 108–96
|
|
|
| The Summit
| 42–37
|- align="center" bgcolor="#ffcccc"
| 80
| April 15
| @ Utah
| L 98–130
|
|
|
| Delta Center
| 42–38
|- align="center" bgcolor="#ffcccc"
| 82
| April 19
| Phoenix
| L 97–100
|
|
|
| The Summit
| 42–40

Player statistics

NOTE: Please write the players statistics in alphabetical order by last name.

See also
1991–92 NBA season

References

Houston Rockets seasons
Houston Rockets
Houston Rockets
Houston Rockets